The 1999 Nigerian Senate election in Kogi State was held on February 20, 1999, to elect members of the Nigerian Senate to represent Kogi State. Tunde Ogbeha representing Kogi West, Ahmed Tijani representing Kogi Central and Alex Kadir representing Kogi East all won on the platform of the Peoples Democratic Party.

Overview

Summary

Results

Kogi West 
The election was won by Tunde Ogbeha of the Peoples Democratic Party.

Kogi Central 
The election was won by Ahmed Tijani of the Peoples Democratic Party.

Kogi East 
The election was won by Alex Kadir of the Peoples Democratic Party.

References 

February 1999 events in Nigeria
Kog
Kogi State Senate elections